Road 48, unofficially called Karbala Highway, is in Markazi Province, Hamedan Province, and Kermanshah Province in western Iran.

It is very important for Iranian government and Iranian people, since many people go to Karbala and Najaf (two Shi'a holy cities) by this road. It reaches the Khosravi international border crossing with Iraq.

Freeway 6 runs parallel to the road from Saveh to Kurijan with plans to run parallel all the way to the border with Iraq at Khosravi. It is connected to M40 of the Arab Mashreq International Road Network.

See also
road 17

References

External links 

 Iran road map on Young Journalists Club

48
Transportation in Hamadan Province
Transportation in Kermanshah Province
Transportation in Markazi Province